George Martin (born Francisco Martínez Celeiro; September 18, 1937 – September 1, 2021) was a Spanish film actor, sometimes credited as Jorge Martín. He is known as a frequent star in the Italian 3 Supermen series and for numerous parts in Spaghetti Westerns and Italian exploitation films.

Death
Martin died in Miami, Florida on September 1, 2021, at the age of 83. The death occurred due to a heart attack caused by kidney failure derived from stomach constipation, after his health had been suffering in recent months since he became infected with COVID-19, according to his wife Mercedes Piedra.

Partial filmography

 Fuera de la ley (1964)
 Apache Fury (1964)
 Texas Ranger (1964)
 Grave of the Gunfighter (1964)
 A Pistol for Ringo (1965)
 Canadian Wilderness (1965)
 The Return of Ringo (1965)
 Kiss Kiss...Bang Bang (1966)
 Per il gusto di uccidere (1966)
 Clint the Stranger (1967)
 Maneater of Hydra (1967)
 Electra One (1967)
 Red Blood, Yellow Gold (1967)
 15 Scaffolds for a Murderer (1967)
 Psychopath (1968)
 3 Supermen a Tokyo (1968)
 Blackie the Pirate (1971)
 Watch Out Gringo! Sabata Will Return (1972)
 The Return of Clint the Stranger (1972)
 Death Carries a Cane (1973)

References

External links 

.

1937 births
2021 deaths
Spanish male film actors
Male Western (genre) film actors
Male Spaghetti Western actors
Male actors from Barcelona